Ku-ring-gai High School (abbreviated as KHS), formerly Ku-ring-gai Creative Arts High School (1996-2016), is a government-funded co-educational comprehensive and specialist secondary day school with a speciality in creative and performing arts. The school is located in North Turramurra, on the Upper North Shore of Sydney, New South Wales, Australia.

School catchment area and student selection 
As a New South Wales Department of Education public high school, KHS accepts all students in Year 7 to Year 12 living in its catchment area. The catchment covers locations in Ku-ring-gai and Hornsby councils, including Dangar Island.

The school also accepts, if there's space, those who "demonstrate outstanding ability and commitment in the creative arts in either dance, music, drama and/or visual arts ". Students who apply for enrolment under this criterion are required to provide a portfolio demonstrating this ability. The school also takes international and exchange students and is part of the International Students Program of the NSW Department of Education.

Campus and facilities 
The school features one of the last remaining bini domes (dome-shaped hall) called the "Margret Preston Hall" and is one of the few public schools in NSW with a full sized hockey field. 

In 2020, refurbishment was completed with the construction of new facilities.

History
The school opened its doors in February 1965 with its first group of Year 7 students. Ku-ring-gai was the first of a second wave of new co-educational high schools built in the Sydney suburbs.

The school's first headmaster was Bill Eason, who later went on to found the Australian Independent School at North Ryde. 

The four houses, which are still part of the school today, and the names of the four original classroom buildings were set in 1965 - Churchill, Curie, Tagore, and Lincoln. The school colours were originally brown and gold.

Ku-ring-gai was a local high school until 1996 when Mrs. B. Peatie became the headmistress and requested permission from the Department of Education to become selective in creative arts. Since then, there have been up to 900 students registered each year. In 2015, it celebrated its 50th year and in 2016 reverted to the name "Ku-ring-gai High School".

Creative arts 
Ku-Ring-Gai is a creative arts-based school; sports specialist classes and history programs are also offered.

Student members of the school choir as well as a large number of dancers are selected to perform at the Arts Unit's Schools Spectacular each year.

Notable alumni 
Catherine Jinks – author

See also 

 List of government schools in New South Wales
 List of creative and performing arts high schools in New South Wales
 List of selective high schools in New South Wales

References

External links 
 Ku-ring-gai High School website

Creative and performing arts high schools in New South Wales
Public high schools in Sydney
1965 establishments in Australia
Educational institutions established in 1965
Turramurra